Daniel Sylvester Battagline, also known as Sylvester The Jester (born 1961), is an American magician, best known for playing a cartoon character who comes to life.  He has had hundreds of stage and television appearances, including NBC’s "World's Wildest Magic," ABC’s "Champions of Magic III", Jerry Lewis's Muscular Dystrophy Telethon and The Discovery Channel’s "More Science of Magic."  He has performed in multiple Las Vegas shows including opening for The Amazing Johnathan, and appearing at Caesar’s Magical Empire.  He also produces a series of magic products, and has been credited with creating the illustrations for various magic publications, such as the cover for The Amazing Johnathan's Every Trick in the Book, and the poster for John Carney's "Mr. Mysto" act. In 1996, he also created a prop for the television show, "Sabrina, the Teenage Witch."  He has been featured on the cover of several magic and culture-related magazines, such as the September 1998 issue of Magic.

Biography

Battagline was born in Youngstown, Ohio, one of three children to Pat Battagline, a plumber, and Merrie Lou Clark, a homemaker.  He grew up in the small town of Berlin Center, Ohio, attending Western Reserve High School, where he began experimenting with magic at the age of 15, after seeing a televised performance by Doug Henning.  He later went on to Youngstown State University, where he studied Fine Art and Theater Arts, before relocating to Los Angeles, where he joined the prestigious Magic Castle community, and performed for the next seven years.  He was best known during this time for a unique sleight of hand move known as "The Sylvester Pitch." During the 1990s, he created the "Ten Foot Pole" effect which remains popular, most recently as the topic of a 2008 TED Conference presentation about unique inventions. He was also mentored by Larry Jennings and Dai Vernon, who referred to Battagline as "a genius".

Battagline's "Sylvester the Jester" character began to emerge in the early 1990s, and over the next several years, he began to tour internationally in over 30 countries.  He was also a key performer and creative consultant in the year-long production of "Las Vegas Magic Express" in Seoul, Korea, which was produced by Kevin James.

Currently, he lives in Bellflower, California and has retired from performing due to Alzheimer's disease.

Awards

 Baguette d’Or (Golden Wand), 1998, Monte Carlo Magic Stars, awarded by Princess Stéphanie of Monaco 
 Kid's Choice, 1998, Junior Jury's Grand Prix, Monte Carlo Magic Stars
 Festival Favorite, 1998, International del Humor, Bogotá, Colombia
 Gold Medal Champion, 1995, Pacific Coast Association of Magicians (PCAM), Santa Clara, California
 Appreciation Award (50th Anniversary Special), 1996, International Brotherhood of Magicians
 The S.C.A.M. Annual Comedy Magic Award, 2007, South Carolina Association of Magicians

Notable nominations

The Magic Castle’s Academy of Magical Arts, Los Angeles, California:

 Lecturer of the Year: 2002, 2009
 Parlour Performer of the Year: 1996, 1997, 1998, 1999, 2001, 2002, 2003, 2004
 Comedy Magician of the Year: 2003
 Stage Magician of the Year: 1998, 1999

List of works

DVDs and videos
 Sylvester Pitch ‘98, 2007, Creative Enterprise/Hotrix, DVD
 Sylvester The Jester Performance, 2006, DVD
 Suspended Dimension (The Jacketless Topit), 2001, Kevin James’ Imagination Unlimited, DVD
 Sylvester Pitch ‘98, 1998, Creative Enterprise/Hotrix, VHS

Lecture Notes
 Sylvester The Jester's Creativity Lecture Notes, 2008
 Sylvester Pitch Lecture Notes, 1993
 Hurtling the Moon, Creative Strategy Lecture Notes, 1995

Criticism 
Battagline has been criticized for his style, including his exaggerated cartoon-like movements, and provocative humor.

References

External links

 Official website
 Performance video at youtube.com
 "Creating Success", podcast interview by Mitchell Anthony
 Drake, Simon. "Visit #2: Sylvester the Jester," Bizarre Magazine, 2009
 Imodei, Ivan. "The Plant" story, Magic's Most Amazing Stories; A Collection of Incredible Stories from World Famous Magicians, 2009.
 Wolf, Michael. "Not Just a Weirdo", Magicana magazine, 2003
 Booth, John. Chapter 4: "Sylvester: The Self-Mayhem Principle" Extending Magic Beyond Credibility, (Linking Ring reprint, August 1999)
 Booth, John. "Sylvester The Surreal Jester", Linking Ring magazine, August 1999
 Levy, Mark. "The Jester is Sylvester!", Magic Magazine, September 1998
 Pogue, David. Magic For Dummies, 1998
 Booth, John. "Memoirs of a Magician’s Ghost", Linking Ring, August 1999
 Giorgio, Tony. Genii magazine, October 1993
 Brown, Judy. L.A. Weekly, April 13, 1995
 Weber, Ken. "A Personal Entertainment Highlight: Sylvester the Jester," Maximum Entertainment, 2002

American magicians
Jesters
1961 births
Living people
People from Bellflower, California
People from Youngstown, Ohio